Longhorn may refer to:

Animals
 English Longhorn, a traditional long-horned brown and white breed of cattle
 Texas Longhorn, a breed of cattle
 Highland cattle, a Scottish breed sometimes called Highland Longhorn
 Longhorn beetle, a family of beetles with very long antennae

In the US state of Texas
 Longhorn, Texas, a community
 Longhorn Dam, on the Colorado River in Austin
 Texas Longhorns, sports teams and organizations at the University of Texas at Austin
 Longhorn, the mascot (a Texas Longhorn bull) of J. Frank Dobie High School, Houston
 Longhorn, A candy of chocolate, pecans, and caramel made by Lammes Candy
Longhorn Railway Company

Technology
 Windows Longhorn, the pre-release internal Microsoft codename of the Windows Vista
 Longhorn Server, the original codename of Windows Server 2008
 Okapi Longhorn, a batch processing server in Okapi Framework

Fictional characters
 Longhorn, a fictional character on the animated television show Freakazoid!
 Longhorn (Transformers), one of several characters in the various "Transformers" fictional universes

Music
 Jay's Longhorn Bar, a former music venue in Minneapolis commonly known as "The Longhorn"
 "Longhorn", a piece of music used as the entrance theme for John Bradshaw Layfield, composed by Jim Johnston

Other uses
 Farman MF.7 Longhorn, a French biplane flown in World War I
 Longhorn cheddar, a type of colby cheese
 Longhorn Kenya Limited, a Kenyan publishing company
 Longhorn Steakhouse, a chain of restaurants in the United States
 Weinheim Longhorns, an American football team in Weinheim, Germany